Harriton House, originally known as Bryn Mawr, is a historic house on the Philadelphia Main Line, most famously the residence of Founding Father Charles Thomson, the secretary of the Continental Congress. It was originally built in 1704 by Rowland Ellis, a Welsh Quaker, and was called Bryn Mawr, meaning high hill. The modern town of Bryn Mawr is named after the house, and the National Register of Historic Places has it listed under the original name.

It was originally built as a T-shaped, two-story fieldstone dwelling with a gable roof. The original front section is approximately 37 feet wide and 22 feet deep and the rear extension is approximately 18 feet wide and 23 feet deep. A one-story brick kitchen was added to the end of the rear extension. The house was renovated in 1911 and major additions were made in 1926.

It was added to the National Register of Historic Places in 1973.

Harriton Association
The Harriton Association was started in 1962 by a group of people who were concerned that the house and its surrounding grounds, which were privately owned at the time, would be subdivided and developed. The Association removed the 1926 additions and restored the house to look as it did when Charles Thomson lived there in time for the 1976 United States Bicentennial.

The Association operates Harriton House as a museum and cultural resource. Tours are given from Wednesday through Saturday, and special events are held at the house throughout the year.

References

External links

 Harriton House official site

Houses completed in 1704
Houses on the National Register of Historic Places in Pennsylvania
Museums in Montgomery County, Pennsylvania
Historic house museums in Pennsylvania
Houses in Montgomery County, Pennsylvania
National Register of Historic Places in Montgomery County, Pennsylvania
1704 establishments in Pennsylvania
Homes of United States Founding Fathers